Clube Desportivo TIM IEC is a professional football club based in Macau. They play in the 2ª Divisão de Macau, the second tier of Macanese football.

Current squad

References

Football clubs in Macau